John Boyden (14 September 1936 – 21 September 2021) was a British classical music executive. After national service in Malaya he joined the staff of the Oxford Street HMV. Boyden then founded his own Philharmonic Records shop in Richmond and the record label John Boyden Recordings. By 1967 he was working with Paul Hamlyn at the Music for Pleasure joint venture with EMI, where he founded the Classics for Pleasure sub-label.

In April 1975 Boyden was appointed the first managing director of the London Symphony Orchestra. He was fired in October after part of the board unsuccessfully attempted to remove chief conductor André Previn. Boyden afterwards wrote for Private Eye as their music correspondent, under the pseudonym Lunchtime O'Boulez. Boyden launched the Enigma Classics record label with Peter Whiteside in 1976, which was sold to WEA two years later. Boyden was disillusioned with the amount of post-production editing on classical music, and re-founded the New Queen's Hall Orchestra to produce music more in keeping with his ideals.

Early life 
Boyden was born in Woolwich, London, on  14 September 1936. He was the son of Frank Boyden, a trumpet player in the London Philharmonic Orchestra, and his wife Agnes (née Yates). Boyden was evacuated to Buckinghamshire at the age of four. He returned to London to attend Bloomfield Road Junior Mixed School in Woolwich, followed by grammar school. In later life Boyden took pride in his state school education, in a field dominated by those who had attended private schools. Boyden undertook his national service in the Queen's Royal Regiment (West Surrey), on deployment in Malaya during the Emergency.

Music career 
Boyden worked at the HMV music shop in Oxford Street, London. He left to found  Philharmonic Records, a shop in Richmond, London.  After learning how to edit master tapes he set up John Boyden Recordings as a record label. Boyden had joined Paul Hamlyn's Music for Pleasure label by 1967, a joint venture with EMI and that sold its repackaged recordings. He created Classics for Pleasure as a sub-label in 1970 and sold 4 million copies in the following 4 years.

In April 1975 Boyden was appointed the first managing director of the London Symphony Orchestra (LSO). At the time André Previn was the orchestra's chief conductor. Some of the orchestra's board considered Previn to be producing "lightweight" interpretations of works, compared to the output of Bernard Haitink at the London Philharmonic Orchestra. These members failed in an effort to remove Previn. Boyden, who had been associated, rightly or wrongly, with the anti-Previn movement, was sacked in October.

Boyden afterwards applied for benefits at the Job Centre. Upon stating his last post was as managing director at the LSO he was told "I don't think we've got any of those [positions available]". Boyden later stated that he considered there to be an excessive drinking culture among members of the orchestra. After his death it was revealed that Boyden was employed by Private Eye as their first music correspondent, under the penname "Lunchtime O'Boulez".

In 1976 Boyden launched the Enigma Classics label with Peter Whiteside. The label started with just ten records, including  a series of Beethoven piano sonata played by John Lill, but was successful and was purchased by WEA in 1978. Boyden afterwards went into musician management, founding the Manygate Management agency.

Boyden became tired of the perfectionism in contemporary orchestral recordings, with minor errors and coughs routinely edited out of tracks. He lamented the people who "want to reduce music to a branch of engineering, to say it has to be nothing more or less than precise, accurate, in tune and together, then fine, the literal-minded can have a field day ... I think music is something far greater than that".  Boyden re-established the New Queen's Hall Orchestra (NQHO) in 1992, to produce music more in line with his ideals. The orchestra had been active at Queen's Hall in the early part of the 20th century, but had dissolved. Boyden liked to think he was continuing the traditions of the original orchestra which regularly played six concerts a week after only three rehearsals.

In his 60-year career in music Boyden spent only seven months (his tenure at the LSO), in the direct employment of a government-subsidised organisation. He later called for cuts to government music subsidies to orchestras.

Personal life 
Boyden married, at age 21, Isabella Gonzalez. That marriage was dissolved and, in 1968, he married Betty Gilbert who died in 2011. Finally, Boyden married, in 2017, Lindsey Erith. He had two sons from his second marriage.  His elder son Adam is a venture capitalist in the US; his second son, Matthew was a barrister and also conducted the NQHO.

Death 
Boyden died on 21 September 2021 from a skull fracture after falling in hospital where he was undergoing treatment for a neuroendocrine tumour.

References 

1936 births
2021 deaths
British music industry executives
People from Woolwich
Private Eye contributors